Yahshua is a proposed transliteration of , the original Hebrew name of Jesus. The pronunciation Yahshua is philologically impossible in the original Hebrew and has no support in archeological findings, such as the Dead Sea scrolls or inscriptions, nor in rabbinical texts as a form of Joshua. Scholarship generally considers the original form of Jesus to be Yeshua, a Hebrew Bible form of Joshua.

Usage and/or support of the name Yahshua is largely restricted to religious groups that are a part of (or otherwise associated with) the Sacred Name and Hebrew Roots movements which, among other things, advocate for the preservation of Hebrew sacred names in translations of the Bible.

Etymology

In translations of the Hebrew Bible into Ancient Greek,  was used to represent the Hebrew/Aramaic name Yeshua, a derivation of the earlier Hebrew , or Joshua. Both names mean 'Yah saves'. As a result, it is a commonly accepted fact within academia that Jesus' native Hebrew/Aramaic name was Yeshua.

Usage

The pronunciation of the older, longer name as Yehoshua is attested to since ancient times. In the 19th century, the Second Great Awakening lead to a religious revival of Protestantism in America which spawned several divergent movements. Among these newfound movements was Adventism, which, among other things, mandated a return to the recognition of the Jewish Sabbath as the Christian Sabbath. Part of a larger attitude to reorient Christianity to what was considered its Jewish roots, Adventism eventually gave rise to groups such as the Assemblies of Yahweh, which taught that the Tetragrammaton should be directly translated as Yahweh as opposed to the traditional translation of simply "". As a part of this, attempts were made to more directly correlate Jesus to the Israelite god.

In Hebrew (which normally writes only consonants), Yehoshua starts with the same two letters as Yahweh. The new pronunciation was produced by incorporating the pronunciation of the first syllable of Yahweh into Yehoshua, producing Yah-shua.

Language of the New Testament

The oldest currently known New Testament manuscripts, particularly those containing more than a handful of verses (as some early papyrus fragments do), were copied a few centuries later than the original individual New Testament books would have been written. The Assemblies of Yahweh believe that during this time these manuscripts, which are extant in Greek, most likely were translated. However, the general consensus of Bible scholars is that the New Testament was originally written only in Koine Greek (save for a number oc words); the claim of the Assemblies of Yahweh therefore received no traction in academia.

As a result, the names Yahweh and Yahshua should have appeared in the original Hebrew or Aramaic texts of the New Testament, according to the Assemblies of Yahweh; but no such texts existed, according to Bible scholars. There is scriptural evidence to suggest that the apostles were using these Hebrew names, such as in Acts 18:12-16. Due to the decision by Jews to no longer pronounce the name, the message of Yahshua – that Yahweh is salvation – would have angered many, argue the Assemblies of Yahweh for their own (fringe) belief. George Howard of the University of Georgia considers the possibility that the Tetragrammaton was retained in the first documents of the Greek translation just as it had been retained in the Septuagint translation of the Hebrew Scriptures.

Although the original manuscripts could be called inspired, Meyer writes that "there is no such thing as an inspired translation". Mistakes are sometimes made in translation and these are passed down to each subsequent translation. An example of a perceived mistake by a translator translating the Hebrew original manuscripts is found in Revelation 19:16. The scripture here says that the Messiah has a name written on his thigh. This lacks sense, but when considering the original Hebrew language the root problem becomes clear. As explained by the Assemblies of Yahweh:

Such arguments have been roundly rejected by academia, wherein the idea that the texts of the New Testament were translations from Hebrew or Aramaic got no traction.

Criticisms
The pronunciation of Yahshua is impossible on a number of levels. The pronunciation Yahshua likewise cannot be found with that spelling anywhere in history, in writings in Hebrew or otherwise, prior to the 1900s.

Hebrew scholar Michael Brown emphatically denies that "Yahshua" was the Hebrew name of Jesus:

See also
 Names and titles of Jesus in the New Testament

References

Bibliography

External links
 The Messiah's Hebrew Name: "Yeshua" or "Yahshua"? - Daniel Botkin argues against "Yahshua" in favor of "Yeshua".
 Yahshua or Yeshua- What Is the Correct Pronunciation? - Bob Wirl, a Sacred Name minister, argues in favor of the name "Yahshua over Yeshua." [This link appears to be broken.]
 What Is The Original Hebrew Name For Jesus?  - Michael L. Brown about the name of Yashua or Yeshua.
 The truth behind the name of the Father

Hebrew-language names
Names of Jesus
Sacred Name Movement